The South Wales Bible Training Institute was a Bible college in Porth. It was started by R. B. Jones in 1919. Classes were initially held in his church's vestry in Ynyshir, but later moved to Tynycymmer Hall in Porth. It was inspired by American fundamentalist Bible schools, especially Moody Bible Institute. It closed in 1937.

South Wales Bible Training Institute trained men and women in Bible knowledge "for all kinds of Christian work at home and abroad." Densil D. Morgan has called it and the Bible College of Wales "Welsh fundamentalism's two most visible inter-war manifestations".

References

1919 establishments in Wales
1937 disestablishments in Wales
Further education colleges in Rhondda Cynon Taf
Bible colleges, seminaries and theological colleges in Wales
Educational institutions established in 1919
Educational institutions disestablished in 1937